Yusra dan Yumna (Yusra and Yumna) is an Indonesian soap opera that aired on RCTI Monday-Friday at 19:00 pm. This soap opera produced by SinemArt, and stars such as: Nikita Willy, Putri Titian, Rezky Aditya, Nadya Almira, Gisela Cindy, Samuel Zylgwyn, Bobby Joseph, Kevin Julio, Nimaz Dewantary, Jessica Mila Agnesia, Maria Lynch, Faris Nahdi and much more

Cast Table

Main Cast

Extended Cast

Single 
 Cinta Putihmu (Nikita Willy)
 Maafkan (Nikita Willy)
 Pantas Untuku (Nikita Willy)
 Luka (Nikita Willy)
 Kutetap Menanti* (Nikita Willy)
 Lebih dari Indah (Nikita Willy)

International broadcasts
  RCTI
  Myanmar Television (dubbed in Indonesian and subtitled in Burmese)
  Astro Pelangi

External links 
 Yusra dan Yumna Plot

Indonesian television soap operas
2012 Indonesian television series debuts